Physegeniopsis is a genus of flies in the family Lauxaniidae.

Species
Physegeniopsis albeto Gaimari, 2010
Physegeniopsis ankhoidea Gaimari, 2010
Physegeniopsis hadrocara Gaimari, 2010

References

Lauxaniidae
Lauxanioidea genera
Diptera of South America